Rise Academy-South Dade Charter School opened in August 2008 and served more than 200 students in Kindergarten through Seventh Grades. It was closed in 2010 after a dispute with Miami-Dade County Public Schools. Test results showed the school had the biggest improvement in test scores in the county and twice as many sixth-graders at Rise passed the test compared with nearby Campbell Drive Middle School (a traditional public school).

Rise Academy-South Dade Charter School is located on two campuses. The West Campus is located at 713 West Palm Drive, Florida City; the East Campus is located at 303 West Palm Drive, Florida City.

References

External links
 www.riseschools.org
 Miami New Times article regarding school closure: 

Charter schools in Florida
Defunct schools in Florida